William Morgan Andrus (July 25, 1907 – March 12, 1982), nicknamed "Andy", was a Major League Baseball player.
He was born in Beaumont, Texas and died in Washington, D.C.

References

External links
 https://www.baseball-reference.com/players/a/andrubi01.shtml

Washington Senators (1901–1960) players
1907 births
1982 deaths
Baseball players from Texas
Sportspeople from Beaumont, Texas